Wang Qun (September 1926 – 12 December 2017) was a Chinese politician who served as Communist Party Secretary of Inner Mongolia Autonomous Region from 1987 to 1994, and Party Chief of Wuhan from 1978 to 1987.

Biography
Wang Qun was born in September 1926 in Xinzhou County, Hubei Province. He joined the Chinese Communist Party (CCP) in August 1944 and participated in the Chinese Civil War.

After the founding of the People's Republic of China in 1949, he worked in the Hubei Military District, as well as local governments in Hubei Province. He served as Communist Party Secretary of Xiangyang County from 1957 to 1969, First Party Secretary of Yichang Prefecture from 1969 to 1978, and First Party Secretary of the provincial capital Wuhan from 1978 to 1987.

In August 1987, Wang was appointed Communist Party Secretary of Inner Mongolia Autonomous Region, and served in the position until August 1994. From May 1993 to December 1996 he also served as Chairman of the Inner Mongolia Regional People's Congress.

Wang was an alternate member of the 12th Central Committee of the Chinese Communist Party, and a full member of the 13th and the 14th Central Committees.

Wang Qun died in Wuhan on 12 December 2017, aged 91.

References

1926 births
2017 deaths
Chinese Communist Party politicians from Hubei
People's Republic of China politicians from Hubei
Political office-holders in Inner Mongolia
Political office-holders in Hubei
Politicians from Wuhan
Members of the 13th Central Committee of the Chinese Communist Party
Members of the 14th Central Committee of the Chinese Communist Party